London Associated Electricity Undertakings Limited was an electricity supply company that operated in central and west London from 1935 to 1948. It was founded to acquire, combine and coordinate the electricity distribution interests of six west London electricity companies.

History 
The London Power Company was established in 1925 by ten London electricity undertakings to centralise the generation of electricity at Battersea Power Station. The constituent companies continued as electricity distribution and sales undertakings.

In 1934 six electricity supply companies in west and central London wished to bring together in one organisation the distribution resources of their constituent companies. This was to standardise and improve the effectiveness and efficiency of electricity supplies in a single organisation. The six constituent companies were the:

 Brompton and Kensington Electricity Supply Company
 Charing Cross Electricity Supply Company
 Chelsea Electricity Supply Company
 Kensington and Knightsbridge Electric Lighting Company
 St. James and Pall Mall Electric Light Company
 Westminster Electricity Supply Corporation

The London Associated Electricity Undertakings Limited was registered as a public company in February 1935. This was under the provisions of the London Electricity (No. 2) Act 1925. The undertaking's declared policy was:

 To build up a single effective organisation in place of the six existing organisations;
 To secure as soon as possible the greatest uniformity in tariffs on the lowest basis attainable;
 To make the best possible speed towards the completion of the engineering programme of the companies in adopting the standard system laid down by the Central Electricity Board.

The administrative mechanism to achieve integration was for the Charing Cross Electricity Supply Company to take over the other five companies and to change its name to Central London Electricity Limited. With effect from 1 January 1937 the whole of the shares of Central London Electricity Limited were held by the non-statutory body London Associated Electricity Undertakings Limited.  Compensation to directors of the constituent companies was set at three years gross fees for loss of office.

The company was able to standardise electricity supplies (240 V, 50 Hz AC) in the combined area and reduced costs significantly. However, the company was unable to attract further companies to the merger.

The war years (1939–45) were difficult for the company. The sale of electricity fell by 30 per cent; the number of consumers fell by 39 per cent and the electrical load by 37.5 per cent. Tariffs had to be increased in 1940 and 1943. The amount of war damage was estimated to be £600,000, with bulk supply sub-stations damaged on 55 occasions and 139 transformer chambers and 1,424 cables were damaged. Recovery began in 1944 with increases in both sales and the number of consumers.

In 1948 the London Associated Electricity Undertakings Limited and Central London Electricity Limited head office was at 60 St. Martins Lane. There were showrooms at: 143/7 Regent Street; 31 Belgrave Road; 254 Earl's Court Road; 147 Sloane Street; and 12 Victoria Street.

The London Associated Electricity Undertakings Limited and Central London Electricity Limited were abolished on 31 March 1948 under the terms of the Electricity Act 1947 which nationalised the British electricity supply industry. The company's high voltage bulk electricity transmission systems were vested in the British Electricity Authority. The local distribution systems and the electricity sales functions were vested in the London Electricity Board (LEB).

Key people 
Chairmen of London Associated Electricity Undertakings Limited were:

 Edward Goulding, 1st Baron Wargrave, 1935–1936
 Sir Frances Fladgate, 1936–37
 Victor Bulwer-Lytton, 2nd Earl of Lytton, 1937–47 
 Clarence Parker, 1947–48

Electricity supply statistics 
The electricity supply statistics for the six constituent companies in 1936, the final year of independent operation, were as follows.

Operating data for the London Associated Electricity Undertakings Limited and Central London Electricity Limited was as shown.

Finances 
The combined share capital of the constituent companies in 1935 was £6,892,194. The London Associated Electricity Undertakings Limited was able to carry out the amalgamation for £7,300.

The electricity tariffs and operational revenue was as follows.

See also 

 List of pre-nationalisation UK electric power companies
 Timeline of the UK electricity supply industry

References 

Defunct electric power companies of the United Kingdom
Electric power companies of England
Electric power infrastructure in England
Energy companies disestablished in 1948